Radio Belgrade 202 is the fourth program of a state-owned and -operated radio station Radio Belgrade in Belgrade, Serbia.

History
The program of Radio Belgrade 202 began broadcasting on June 27, 1969. Conceived as a city station, in the beginning, the signal could be heard only in the area of Belgrade, broadcasting music and short informational programs. The program was created as an addition to the previous radio offering, which consisted of the First, Second and Third programs of Radio Belgrade. The first host was Hanija Gaković, and the music editor was Darinka Ristović. Initially, the station broadcast for 18 hours a day, and on May 1, 1987, the broadcast of all-day programming began, with improved coverage the entire territory of Serbia.

References

External links 
 Radio Belgrade 202

Radio stations in Serbia
International broadcasters
Eastern Bloc mass media
Radio stations established in 1969
1969 establishments in Serbia
Mass media in Belgrade
Radio Television of Serbia